Austria sent a delegation to compete at the 1960 Summer Paralympics in Rome, Italy. Its athletes finished fourth in the overall medal count.

Medalists

See also 
 1960 Summer Paralympics
 Austria at the 1960 Summer Olympics

References 

Nations at the 1960 Summer Paralympics
1960
Summer Paralympics